OPPG may refer to:

 Panjgur Airport (ICAO: OPPG), Balochistan, Pakistan
 Office of Public & Professional Guardians, housed within the Florida Department of Elder Affairs 
 Operation Pedro Pan Group, Inc., a non-profit charitable organization founded in 1991 by the former children of Pedro Pan 

 Opponents Points per game, in sports statistics
 Osteoporosis-pseudoglioma syndrome, a medical condition